"Drop It on Me" is a song recorded by the Puerto Rican singer Ricky Martin that was included on his tenth album, Life (2005). The single, features Daddy Yankee.

Background
This song is produced by will.i.am of The Black Eyed Peas and Luny Tunes. Martin performed it at the 2005 Victoria's Secret Fashion Show.

During his visit in Jordan in 2005, Martin recorded an Arabic/Spanglish version of "Drop It on Me" and "Enta Omri" with Arabic pop star Cheb Mami.

Chart performance
It was the second US single, yet it failed to chart on the US Billboard Hot 100. It only peaked at number twenty on the Bubbling Under Hot 100 Singles and number twenty-three on the Latin Pop Songs.

Formats and track listings
Japanese promotional CD single
"Drop It on Me" (featuring Daddy Yankee and Taboo of The Black Eyed Peas) – 3:54

US promotional CD single
"Drop It on Me" (featuring Daddy Yankee, Debi Nova & Taboo) – 3:54

Charts

References

2005 singles
Ricky Martin songs
Daddy Yankee songs
Songs written by Daddy Yankee
Songs written by will.i.am
Song recordings produced by will.i.am
Song recordings produced by Luny Tunes
2005 songs
Songs written by Ricky Martin
Columbia Records singles
Songs written by George Pajon
Songs written by Francisco Saldaña
Songs written by Toby Gad
Songs written by Víctor Cabrera